Ronald Ames Guidry (born August 28, 1950), nicknamed "Louisiana Lightning" and "Gator", is an American former professional baseball pitcher who played 14 seasons in Major League Baseball (MLB) for the New York Yankees. Guidry was also the pitching coach of the Yankees from 2006 to 2007.

Guidry's major league career began in 1975. He was a member of World Series-winning Yankees teams in 1977 and 1978, both over the Los Angeles Dodgers. He won the American League Cy Young Award in 1978, winning 25 games and losing only 3. He also won five Gold Glove Awards and appeared in four All-Star games. Guidry served as captain of the Yankees beginning in 1986; he retired from baseball in 1989. In 2003, the Yankees retired Guidry's uniform number (49) and dedicated a plaque to him in Monument Park.

Early life
Guidry was born in Lafayette, Louisiana. He attended and pitched for the University of Southwestern Louisiana. He was a combined 12–5 with a 2.03 earned run average (ERA) and 137 strikeouts as a two-year letterman with the Ragin' Cajuns baseball team in 1969 and 1970.

Playing career
Guidry was selected in the third round (67th overall) by the New York Yankees in the 1971 MLB draft. After four seasons in the minor leagues, he pitched briefly in the major leagues in the 1975 and 1976 seasons. He was nearly sent to the Baltimore Orioles as part of a trade deadline blockbuster on June 15, 1976, but the Yankees did not want to give up any more left-handed pitchers beyond the three (Scott McGregor, Tippy Martinez and Rudy May) that they had already included in the deal. The following year he was to have been dealt to Toronto for Bill Singer in a transaction that was approved by the Yankees but was vetoed by Blue Jays president Peter Bavasi.

In 1977, Guidry began the season as a relief pitcher but was moved into the Yankees' starting rotation. On April 30, he was called on to make an emergency start in replace of Mike Torrez, recently acquired in a trade from the Athletics, who had not joined the team in time for what was supposed to be his first start. In the longest outing Guidry could remember since his Eastern League days of 1974, he helped the Yankees beat the Seattle Mariners 3–0. Guidry finished the season with a 16–7 record. His emergence as a starter after his previous seasons in the bullpen made him one of the Yankees' biggest surprises in 1977. He helped lead the Yankees to a World Series championship.

In 1978, Guidry posted a career year that has been described as the all-time best season by a Yankees pitcher. Against the California Angels on June 17, he struck out a Yankee-record 18 batters.  Guidry's 18-strikeout performance is usually cited as the launching pad of the Yankee Stadium tradition of fans standing and clapping for a strikeout with two strikes on the opposing batter. For the season, Guidry went 25–3, setting the all-time mark for winning percentage by a pitcher with at least twenty wins. He led the league with a 1.74 ERA, an .893 winning percentage, nine shutouts, and 248 strikeouts. Guidry's success in 1978 was due in large part to his mastery of the slider. His 248 strikeouts set a Yankees' franchise record for most strikeouts by a pitcher in a single season, a record that stood until 2022 when Gerrit Cole recorded 257 strikeouts.

Guidry's 25th win of the 1978 regular season was his most significant, as it came in the Yankees' 5–4 win over the Boston Red Sox in a one-game playoff at Fenway Park in Boston to determine the American League East division winner. The game is best known for Bucky Dent's seventh-inning, three-run home run that gave the Yankees a 3–2 lead. Later that month, the Yankees again won the World Series over the Los Angeles Dodgers. Guidry won the 1978 American League Cy Young Award unanimously. He also finished second in the American League Most Valuable Player voting to Boston Red Sox slugger Jim Rice. In addition, Guidry was named The Sporting News AL Pitcher and Major League Player of the Year. Had he not taken the loss in Toronto on September 20, when his record at the time was 22-2, he would have become the first (and to date, only), pitcher ever with at least a .900 winning percentage, and at least 20 wins in a season. Ie…the first 20-game winner, to also lose fewer than three games.

Guidry was named to the American League All-Star Team in 1978, 1979, 1982, and 1983. Known as an excellent fielder, Guidry won a Gold Glove each year from 1982 through 1986. In 1984, Guidry won the Roberto Clemente Award, given annually to the Major Leaguer who "'best exemplifies the game of baseball, sportsmanship, community involvement and the individual’s contribution to his team.'"

On August 7, 1984, Guidry struck out three batters (Carlton Fisk, Tom Paciorek and Greg Luzinski) on nine pitches in the ninth inning of a 7–0 win over the Chicago White Sox.  Guidry became the eighth American League pitcher and the 27th pitcher in major-league history to accomplish an immaculate inning. In 1985, he led the American League with 22 wins. Guidry and Willie Randolph were named co-captains of the Yankees on March 4, 1986.

The latter years of Guidry's 14-year major league career were hindered by shoulder and elbow injuries. He retired from baseball on July 12, 1989.

Guidry's number 49 was retired on August 23, 2003. The Yankees also dedicated a plaque to Guidry in Monument Park at Yankee Stadium. The plaque calls Guidry "a dominating pitcher", a "respected leader", and "a true Yankee." Each living Yankee previously honored with a plaque in Monument Park was on hand for the ceremony: Phil Rizzuto, Yogi Berra, Whitey Ford, Reggie Jackson and Don Mattingly.

Coaching career
Guidry joined Yankees manager Joe Torre's coaching staff as pitching coach in the 2006 season, replacing Mel Stottlemyre. Guidry was criticized in 2007 because the Yankees' highly acclaimed pitching staff was underachieving. In 2007, Yankees pitchers walked the sixth-most batters overall in the Major Leagues; this was the most walks in a season for a Yankees pitching staff since 2000. Torre's departure from the Yankees following the 2007 season ended Guidry's tenure as pitching coach. Though he was interested in returning to the Yankees for the 2008 season, he was not offered a position on new manager Joe Girardi's coaching staff.  He did return to the Yankees as a spring training instructor.

Former New York Times writer Harvey Araton wrote a book called Driving Mr. Yogi: Yogi Berra, Ron Guidry, and Baseball's Greatest Gift that profiles the friendship Guidry had with Yankees' Hall of Fame catcher (and Guidry's former coach and manager) Yogi Berra.

Personal life

Guidry is married to Bonnie Rutledge Guidry; their wedding was on September 23, 1972. They have three children: two daughters, Jamie and Danielle, and a son, Brandon.

Guidry is a member of the Knights of Columbus.

See also

List of Major League Baseball annual ERA leaders
List of Major League Baseball annual wins leaders
List of Major League Baseball single-game strikeout leaders
List of Major League Baseball players who spent their entire career with one franchise

Sources

External links

Ron Guidry at Pura Pelota (Venezuelan Professional Baseball League)

1950 births
Living people
Albany-Colonie Yankees players
American League All-Stars
American League ERA champions
American League wins champions
Baseball players from Louisiana
Cajun sportspeople
Cardenales de Lara players
American expatriate baseball players in Venezuela
Columbus Clippers players
Cy Young Award winners
Gold Glove Award winners
Fort Lauderdale Yankees players
Johnson City Yankees players
Kinston Eagles players
Louisiana Ragin' Cajuns baseball players
Major League Baseball pitchers
Major League Baseball pitching coaches
Major League Baseball players with retired numbers
New York Yankees coaches
New York Yankees players
Sportspeople from Lafayette, Louisiana
Sportspeople from Manhattan
Baseball players from New York City
Syracuse Chiefs players
West Haven Yankees players